FK Podkonice is a Slovak football team, based in the town of Podkonice. The club was founded in 1959. Club colors are blue and white. FK Podkonice home stadium is Štadión na Brodku with a capacity of 800 spectators.

Current squad

Staff

Current technical staff

Historical names
 FK Podkonice (?–present)

External links 

 Futbalnet profile   
  

Football clubs in Slovakia
Association football clubs established in 1959
1959 establishments in Czechoslovakia